New River Lagoon may refer to:

 New River (Belize)
 Precipitous Bluff (New River Lagoon), Tasmania